Malaysia–Uganda relations refers to bilateral foreign relations between Malaysia and Uganda. Malaysia does not have an embassy in Uganda while Uganda has a High Commission in Kuala Lumpur and were also accredited to Brunei Darussalam, Indonesia, Philippines, Thailand, Vietnam, Lao PDR, Cambodia and Myanmar.

History 

Both countries were once part of the British Empire and Uganda established a diplomatic relations with Malaysia immediately after attaining independence in 1962.

Economic relations 
In 1998, Malaysia and Uganda signed a memorandum of understanding towards economic, scientific, technical and cultural co-operation agreement. While in 2011, Malaysia and Uganda signed an MoU on standards during the CHOGM meeting in Perth. A Malaysian university also has decided to open a campus in Uganda. Some Malaysian palm oil company has already operating in Kalangala at the invitation of President Yoweri Museveni. Another Malaysian oil palm company also has invested a total of U$10 million in the country.

Further reading 
 President receives former Malaysian Premier State House of Uganda

References 

 
Uganda
Bilateral relations of Uganda
Uganda
Uganda and the Commonwealth of Nations